The Canon EOS M50, called Canon EOS Kiss M in Japan, is a digital mirrorless interchangeable-lens camera announced by Canon on February 26, 2018 and sale began on March 23, 2018. 

As with all of the Canon EOS M series cameras, the M50 uses the Canon EF-M lens mount. An adapter is available for use with Canon EF lenses.

Key features
Videos with 4K resolution and 23.98 fps or 25 fps (PAL / NTSC), but no 30 fps mode. File size can be up to 4GB.
1080/60p and 720/120p HD video
ISO 100 – 25,600, expandable up to 51,200.
Dual Pixel CMOS autofocus (except 4K video - only contrast autofocus).
2.36-million dot OLED built-in electronic viewfinder (EVF). 
The DIGIC 8 processor was introduced with this camera.

Mark II
Its successor, the Canon EOS M50 Mark II was fielded in the US in October 2020.

See also
Canon EOS M
Canon EOS M2
Canon EOS M3
Canon EOS M5
Canon EOS M6
Canon EOS M6 Mark II
Canon EOS M10
Canon EOS M100

References

External links 

Canon EOS M (UK)
Canon EOS M Series (UK)
Canon EOS M50 (USA)
Canon EOS M50 Manual (USA)
Canon EOS M50 Review by the-digital-picture.com

Canon EF-M-mount cameras
Cameras introduced in 2018